Hammonds Creek is a  long 3rd order tributary to the Cape Fear River in Bladen County, North Carolina.

Variant names
According to the Geographic Names Information System, it has also been known historically as:
Hammond Creek

Course
Hammonds Creek rises on the Whites Creek divide about 3 miles south of Elizabethtown, North Carolina.  Hammonds Creek then flows east to join the Cape Fear River about 0.25 miles south of Atkinson Landing.

Watershed
Hammonds Creek drains  of area, receives about 49.5 in/year of precipitation, has a wetness index of 514.36 and is about 31% forested.

See also
List of rivers of North Carolina

References

Rivers of North Carolina
Rivers of Bladen County, North Carolina
Tributaries of the Cape Fear River